Glendo State Park is a public recreation area surrounding Glendo Reservoir on the North Platte River in Platte and Converse counties in Wyoming in the United States. The park offers  of mountain bike trails, multiple camping areas totaling more than 500 campsites, plus fishing and other water activities with the reservoir producing several state record-size fish. The park is managed by the Wyoming Division of State Parks and Historic Sites.

History
The Glendo dam, power plant and reservoir were constructed between 1954 and 1958. In June 1959, the Wyoming Parks Commission formed a contract with the U.S. Bureau of Reclamation for the administration and development of facilities for recreational purposes at Glendo Reservoir.

In the news
A total solar eclipse passed directly over the park on Monday, August 21, 2017. The midpoint of totality occurred at 17:46 UTC (local time: 11:46 a.m. MDT), with totality lasting for 2 minutes 28 seconds.

References

External links

 Glendo State Park Wyoming State Parks, Historic Sites & Trails
Glendo State Park Brochure Wyoming State Parks, Historic Sites & Trails

State parks of Wyoming
Protected areas of Converse County, Wyoming
Protected areas of Platte County, Wyoming
Protected areas established in 1959
1959 establishments in Wyoming